Coleman Hawkins All Stars is an album by saxophonist Coleman Hawkins featuring trumpeter Joe Thomas and trombonist Vic Dickenson which was recorded in 1960 and released on the Swingville label.

Reception

Scott Yanow of Allmusic states, "Hawkins proves again and again why his sound is not only the epitome of jazz, but forever timeless... The demonstrative yet subtle Hawkins is in full flight here, with the equally elegant Thomas and naturally subdued Dickenson in lock step. What a joy they must have been to hear together at a club or concert date, if in fact it happened in this small-group setting".

Track listing 
 "You Blew Out the Flame in My Heart" (Ervin Drake, Johnny Hodges, Jimmy Shirl) – 5:58  
 "More Bounce to the Vonce" (Osie Johnson) – 9:00  
 "I'm Beginning to See the Light" (Duke Ellington, Don George, Johnny Hodges, Harry James) – 6:55  
 "Cool Blues" (Jerry Valentine) – 8:10  
 "Some Stretching" (Coleman Hawkins, Osie Johnson) – 12:16

Personnel 
Coleman Hawkins – tenor saxophone
Joe Thomas – trumpet
Vic Dickenson – trombone
Tommy Flanagan – piano
Wendell Marshall – bass
Osie Johnson – drums, tambourine

References 

Coleman Hawkins albums
Joe Thomas (trumpeter) albums
Vic Dickenson albums
1960 albums
Swingville Records albums
Albums recorded at Van Gelder Studio
Albums produced by Esmond Edwards